The Bell Labs Holmdel Complex, in Holmdel Township, Monmouth County, New Jersey, United States, functioned for 44 years as a research and development facility, initially for the Bell System and later Bell Labs. The centerpiece of the campus is an Eero Saarinen–designed structure that served as the home to over 6,000 engineers and researchers. This modernist building, dubbed "The Biggest Mirror Ever" by Architectural Forum, due to its mirror box exterior, was the site of a Nobel Prize discovery, the laser cooling work of Steven Chu.  The building has undergone renovations into a multi-purpose living and working space, dubbed Bell Works by its redevelopers. Since 2013 it has been operated by Somerset Development, who redeveloped the building into a mixed-use office for high-tech startup companies. The complex was listed on the National Register of Historic Places in 2017.



History
Before the present building, the site was used by Bell Telephone Laboratories for research. Karl Guthe Jansky invented radio astronomy there, and a monument was placed at the former location  of the antenna almost seventy years later in 1998. The monument is a stylized sculpture of the antenna and is oriented as Jansky's antenna was at 7:10 p.m. on September 16, 1932, at a moment of maximum signal caused by alignment with the center of our galaxy in the direction of the constellation Sagittarius.

In 1957, the American Telephone and Telegraph Company (AT&T) began to plan a research laboratory in Holmdel Township in Central New Jersey. Constructed between 1959 and 1962, this complex was one of the final projects of Finnish-American architect Eero Saarinen before his death in 1961. Used as a research and development complex, it served the needs of the Bell Laboratories division of AT&T, later part of Lucent, and Alcatel-Lucent. Basic research, applied hardware development, and software development occurred in the building.

The building's distinctive features, including its mirror-like appearance, led to recognition as the Laboratory of the Year by R&D in 1967.

The building was expanded in 1966 and 1982 to its final size of two million square feet of office and laboratory space. Despite these expansions, the original curtain wall design remained intact, as did the unique layout of the site, which included a large elliptical master plan and country-road like approach. Over its active life-span, the facility and its layout were studied in universities as models of modernist architecture. Internally, the building is divided into four pavilions of labs and offices, each separated from the others by a cross-shaped atrium. The internal pavilions are linked via sky-bridges and perimeter walkway.

Also of note is the water tower on the complex. The three-legged design reminded people of a transistor-- a major achievement of Bell Labs (in 1947 at a different location). Despite a total lack of historical evidence, an urban legend claims that the designer actually intended to memorialize the transistor. Another urban legend-- less widely circulated than the transistor story-- claims that the concrete floodlight stand at the base of the tower was originally a water fountain. The tower is still in usable condition more than 40 years after its construction.

In 2006, Alcatel-Lucent contracted to sell the facility to Preferred Real Estate Investments in the process of restructuring the company's research efforts. Despite initial plans to maintain the original buildings and keep the complex as a corporate office park, economic developments later resulted in Preferred seeking to re-zone as residential property. As a result, the complex was added to The Cultural Landscape Foundation's list of 10 Most Endangered Historic Sites in New Jersey in May 2007. Additionally action led to the creation of a citizen's group, Preserving Holmdel, by former Bell employees, to lobby for keeping the complex as it was when in use as a laboratory. Working with the community, ideas for changes such as a university center or recreational complex, in portions of the former facility are under consideration.

The Preferred transaction did not close and on May 17, 2012 Holmdel Township declared the site as an "Area in Need of Redevelopment" and adopted a Redevelopment Plan for the property that included various adaptive reuses of the main building and the construction of up to 40 single family homes and 185 age-restricted townhouses outside the main ring road surrounding the building. The Redevelopment Plan is available on the Township's website. The complex is currently under contract to Somerset Development LLC. Somerset has provided concept plans for the redevelopment of the complex in accordance with the Redevelopment Plan and is in discussions with Township officials concerning the details of those plans.

In September 2013, it was announced that the property was purchased by Somerset Development Corp for $27 million for a redevelopment project planned to include a health and wellness center, skilled nursing facility and assisted living center, a hotel, restaurants and shopping, spa, office spaces and a 20,000-square-foot public library. Recreational space and luxury homes were planned for the surrounding land. Toll Brothers was slated to be the residential developer the project. Several office tenants have moved into the Bell Works building, and there is a cafe now open in the main lobby. In November 2016, Nokia completed its acquisition of Alcatel-Lucent.

Architect Alexander Gorlin designed the 2018-2019 renovation which includes opening up the laboratory spaces to the atrium light by replacing Saarinen's metal panels with glass.  He also redesigned the two mammoth 1,000 x 100 ft atria floors.  Skylights were replaced with transparent photovoltaic panels, and a hotel is planned for the roof.

In July 2016 iCIMS announced plans to move their headquarters to the facility to become the anchor tenant.  They moved in on November 27, 2017.

In April 2017 Guardian Life Insurance Company announced plans to move several hundred employees to the facility.

The exterior and some interior shots of the facility serve as the fictional headquarters of Lumon Industries, where the main characters of the 2022 Apple TV+ show Severance are employed.

Gallery

References

Buildings and structures in Monmouth County, New Jersey
Research institutes in New Jersey
Bell Labs
Commercial buildings in New Jersey
Modernist architecture in New Jersey
International style architecture in New Jersey
Eero Saarinen structures
Physics institutes
AT&T buildings
Holmdel Township, New Jersey
Alcatel-Lucent
National Register of Historic Places in Monmouth County, New Jersey
New Jersey Register of Historic Places